A group  acts 2-transitively on a set  if it acts transitively on the set of distinct ordered pairs .

The group action is sharply 2-transitive if such  is unique.

A 2-transitive group is a group such that there exists a group action that's 2-transitive and faithful. Similarly we can define sharply 2-transitive group.

The definition works in general with k replacing 2. Such multiply transitive permutation groups can be defined for any natural number k. Specifically, a permutation group G acting on n points is  k-transitive if, given two sets of points a1, ... ak and b1, ... bk with the property that all the ai are distinct and all the bi are distinct, there is a group element g in G which maps ai to bi for each i between 1 and k. The Mathieu groups are important examples.

Examples 
Every group is trivially 1-transitive, by its action on itself by left-multiplication.

The group of n-dimensional projective transforms almost acts sharply (n+2)-transitively on the n-dimensional real projective space . The almost is because the (n+2) points must be in general linear position.

Classifications of 2-transitive groups 
Every 2-transitive group is a primitive group, but not conversely. Every Zassenhaus group is 2-transitive, but not conversely.  The solvable 2-transitive groups were classified by Bertram Huppert and are described in the list of transitive finite linear groups.  The insoluble groups were classified by  using the classification of finite simple groups and are all almost simple groups.

See also 
 Multiply transitive group

References 

 
 
 
 
 

Permutation groups